Christian Pitre (born October 13, 1983) is an American actress known for her roles in Bounty Killer and Crazy, Stupid, Love.

Career 
Pitre is best known for her leading role as Mary Death in the 2013 post-apocalyptic film Bounty Killer opposite Matthew Marsden and Kristanna Loken. The Hollywood Reporter remarked that Pitre "spectacularly fulfills her role’s physical and athletic demands", although dismissed the film as "utterly silly and derivative but also undeniably entertaining". She is also known for her role as Kristen in Shannon Christian's 2004 drama film Playing Clandestine, her screen debut, a role which she won after meeting an actor who knew the director in Nashville.

In 2011, she featured as a waitress in Glenn Ficarra and John Requa's romantic drama Crazy, Stupid, Love, opposite Steve Carell and Ryan Gosling. In 2009 she appeared in an episode of CSI: Miami, and in 2013 appeared as Claire in two episodes of the comedy series Adopted. In 2014 Pitre played the character of Victoria in an episode of True Blood.

In 2014, she was cast in the role of Emma Anderson in sci-fi film Teleios, which was released under the title "Beyond the Trek" in 2017.

Filmography

Film

Television

References

External links
 
Christian Pitre on Facebook
Christian Pitre on Twitter

American actresses
1983 births
Living people
21st-century American women